The Myanmar Gazette (Yadanabon Naypyidaw Thadinza) is a San Gabriel Valley-based Burmese language newspaper intended for overseas Burmese, with a primary focus on Burmese related news in the United States and Canada. The monthly paper has a total circulation of 12,000, and is distributed at major cities across the US and Canada with sizable Burmese populations. The paper's secondary target audience includes overseas Burmese in Asia, mainly Thailand, Malaysia, Singapore and Japan.

The typical coverage of the paper is a mix of Burmese American community news, Burmese celebrity interviews, and US and world news. The paper, usually 28 to 32 pages long, devoted a considerable number of pages to Cyclone Nargis coverage. The freely distributed paper also contains a number of Burmese American advertisements. The paper uses the tabloid format.

History
The paper was founded in 2006 by two Los Angeles-based Burmese-Americans, Thakhin Kai Bwor and Maung Maung Kyi
. The paper's mission purportedly is to "promote networking amongst Burmese Americans towards a more civic-minded community". The first issue was published in July 2006. The company has established scholarships for local students and actively pursues its mission of improving literacy and education in local youth.

Team members
 Chair: Phillip Zaw-Htun Kaw
 Editor in Chief: Gyi Soe
 Publisher: Myanmar Gazette D.B.A.
 Editors: Nyo Khet Kyaw, Saung Oo Pan, Min Let
 Design Director: Kai
 Contributing Writer: Maung Moe Nyo, Miemie Winn Byrd, Ed.D.
 Advertising Director: Swe Swe Aye
 Japan Representative: Sein Zaw Than
 Myanmar Representative: George Kyaw Asahi

References

Asian-American culture in California
Burmese American
Mass media in Myanmar